Noppert is a surname. Notable people with the surname include:

Andries Noppert (born 1994), Dutch footballer
Danny Noppert (born 1990), Dutch darts player

See also
Nippert
Oppert